The fifth season of the American television comedy The Office premiered in the United States in the 2008–2009 television season on NBC on September 25, 2008 and concluded on May 14, 2009.  The fifth season consisted of 28 half-hours of material, divided into 24 half-hour episodes and two hour-long episodes.  The Office is an American adaptation of the British TV series of the same name, and is presented in a mockumentary format, portraying the daily lives of office employees in the Scranton, Pennsylvania branch of the fictitious Dunder Mifflin Paper Company. The season stars Steve Carell, Rainn Wilson, John Krasinski, Jenna Fischer, and B. J. Novak, with supporting performances from Ed Helms, Melora Hardin, Leslie David Baker, Brian Baumgartner, Creed Bratton, Kate Flannery, Mindy Kaling, Angela Kinsey, Paul Lieberstein, Oscar Nunez, Craig Robinson, and Phyllis Smith.  

The fifth season of The Office aired on Thursdays at 9:00 p.m. (Eastern). The season was released on DVD in a box set containing five disks featuring all 28 episodes with audio commentaries on select episodes. The DVD was released by Universal Studios Home Entertainment.

Production
The fifth season of the show was produced by Reveille Productions and Deedle-Dee Productions, both in association with Universal Media Studios starting from late July 2008. The show is based upon the British series created by Ricky Gervais and Stephen Merchant, both of whom are executive producers on both the US and UK versions. The Office is produced by Greg Daniels, who is also an executive producer. Daniels would have a limited role in this season, not writing an episode, as he was busy writing his new show, Parks and Recreation which he co-created with Office writer/producer Michael Schur, who left the writing staff of The Office to focus on the new show. Returning writers from the previous season include Mindy Kaling, B. J. Novak, Paul Lieberstein, Lee Eisenberg, Gene Stupnitsky, Lester Lewis, Brent Forrester, Justin Spitzer, and Jennifer Celotta. This season saw many new additions to the writing staff, including Ryan Koh, Aaron Shure, Charlie Grandy, Anthony Q. Farrell, Warren Lieberstein, and Halsted Sullivan. Paul Lieberstein and Celotta were promoted to executive producers, with Lieberstein becoming the new showrunner, to take over from Daniels. Kaling, Novak, Eisenberg and Stupnitsky were co-executive producers; Lewis and Forrester were consulting producers; and Spitzer and Grandy were producers.

This season featured 28 episodes directed by 16 directors. Paul Feig, Jeffrey Blitz, Ken Kwapis, and Randall Einhorn each directed several episodes during the season, while Greg Daniels, David Rogers, Stephen Merchant, Jason Reitman, Dean Holland, Asaad Kelada, Ken Whittingham, and Paul Lieberstein directed an episode each. Writers Jennifer Celotta, Gene Stupnitsky and Brent Forrester each made their directorial debut, and series star Steve Carell directed his first episode.

Season overview 
Notable ongoing plots that affect the fifth season and beyond include:

 Jim Halpert's engagement to Pam Beesly
 Michael's relationship with HR rep Holly Flax, which ends when Holly is transferred to Nashua
 The Scranton returns of Ryan Howard and Toby Flenderson
 Pam going to art school in New York City
 Angela Martin's continuing affair with Dwight Schrute, despite her engagement to Andy Bernard
 The arrival of no-nonsense corporate employee Charles Miner to Scranton
 Michael quitting Dunder Mifflin to form his own paper company (The Michael Scott Paper Company), with Pam and Ryan joining Michael in his new venture
 The hiring of Kelly "Erin" Hannon as the new Scranton branch receptionist

Cast

Many characters portrayed by The Office cast are based on the British version of the show. While these characters normally have the same attitude and perceptions as their British counterparts, the roles have been redesigned to better fit the American show. The show is known for its generally large cast size, with many of its actors and actresses known particularly for their improvisational work.

Main
 Steve Carell as Michael Scott, Regional Manager of the Dunder Mifflin Scranton Branch. Loosely based on David Brent, Gervais' character in the British version, Scott is a dim-witted and lonely man, who attempts to win friends as the office comedian, usually making himself look bad in the process. 
 Rainn Wilson as Dwight Schrute, who, based upon Gareth Keenan, is the office's top-performing sales representative. 
 John Krasinski as Jim Halpert, a sales representative, assistant manager, and prankster, who is based upon Tim Canterbury, and is in love with Pam Beesly, the receptionist. 
 Jenna Fischer as Pam Beesly, who is based on Dawn Tinsley. She is shy, but in many cases a cohort with Jim in his pranks on Dwight. 
 B. J. Novak as Ryan Howard, based on Ricky Howard and Neil Godwin, who at the end of the fourth season was arrested while acting as Vice President, North East Region and Director of New Media, returns to Scranton as a temp on the fifth season. On the episode "Frame Toby", Novak's character leaves the office to travel to Thailand. Novak actually took a leave of absence from the show to appear in Quentin Tarantino's film, Inglourious Basterds, although he resumed his role later in the season.

Starring

 Ed Helms as Andy Bernard, a preppy salesman with anger issues.
 Melora Hardin as Jan Levinson, a former Dunder Mifflin employee and Michael's ex-girlfriend, who is only present at the beginning of the season.
 Leslie David Baker as Stanley Hudson, a grumpy salesman.
 Brian Baumgartner as Kevin Malone, a dim-witted accountant, based on Keith Bishop.
 Creed Bratton as Creed Bratton, the office’s strange quality assurance officer.
 Kate Flannery as Meredith Palmer, the promiscuous supplier relations representative.
 Mindy Kaling as Kelly Kapoor, the pop-culture obsessed customer service representative.
 Angela Kinsey as Angela Martin, a judgmental accountant and Dwight’s main love interest.
 Paul Lieberstein as Toby Flenderson, the sad-eyed human resources representative who left to Costa Rica on the fourth-season finale, who returns to replace Holly Flax.
 Oscar Nunez as Oscar Martinez, an intelligent accountant, who is also gay.
 Craig Robinson as Darryl Philbin, the warehouse supervisor.
 Phyllis Smith as Phyllis Vance, a motherly saleswoman.

Special guest stars
 Amy Ryan as Holly Flax, Michael's love interest.
 Idris Elba as Charles Miner, the new Vice President of the North East Region.

Recurring
 Andy Buckley as David Wallace, Dunder Mifflin’s CFO.
 Bobby Ray Shafer as Bob Vance, Phyllis’ husband, who runs Vance Refrigeration.
 Hugh Dane as Hank Tate, the building’s security guard.
 Lisa K. Wyatt as Lynn, Kevin's love interest.
 Ellie Kemper as Erin Hannon, the new receptionist after Pam left for the Michael Scott Paper Company. She is the new love interest of Andy.

Notable guests
 David Denman as Roy Anderson, a former warehouse worker and Pam’s ex-fiancé, who now works at a vitamin store.
 Wendi McLendon-Covey as Marie, a concierge at a hotel in Canada.
 Dan Bakkedahl as Roger Prince Jr., the son of the owner of Prince Family Paper.
 Rick Overton as William Beesly, Pam's father.
 Rashida Jones as Karen Filippelli, Jim’s ex-girlfriend, who is now regional manager of the Utica branch.
 Rob Huebel as A.J., Holly's boyfriend at the Nashua branch.
 Katie Aselton as the Glove Girl, an unnamed woman that Michael meets at a blood drive.
 Ranjit Chowdhry as Vikram, a telemarketer that Michael used to work with.
 Connie Sawyer as "Nana" Scott, Michael's grandmother.

Reception

Ratings
The fifth-season premiere "Weight Loss" received a 4.9/11 in the Nielsen ratings meaning that it was seen by 4.9% of all 18- to 49-year-olds, and 13% of all 18- to 49-year-olds watching television at the time of the broadcast. This marked a rise in the ratings set by the fourth season finale, "Goodbye, Toby". The season reached a high with "Stress Relief" due to it airing after Super Bowl XLIII. The season finale, "Company Picnic" became the lowest-rated episode of the season with 6.72 million viewers and a 3.9 rating/12% share in the 18–49 demographic. Ratings taken at the end of the season placed it at #52 out of 193 programs. This marked a significant rise in the ratings from the previous season.

Review
The Office: Season Five received generally positive reviews. DVDTalk.com rated the season four stars out of five saying that "After a truncated and ever-so-slightly uneven fourth year, Season 5 of The Office stands tall as one of the finest to date. The show's effortless balance of drama, intrigue and pitch-perfect comedy remains remarkably consistent, thanks to strong performances, clever writing and a devoted creative team."  Film.com gave the season a positive review saying "Season five reminds us why we continue to root for Michael Scott". Sitcoms Online reviewed the Season 5 DVD set, and in the final comments section of the review said "It's a great show, and a great set, and it'll be extremely interesting to see how the show is continued this fall. It's the funniest show on broadcast TV right now, in my opinion, and I highly recommend the fifth season." Travis Fickett of IGN stated that it "feels a lot like the downward slope of a great series. I don't believe this was a bad season, but it is a season that let us see the show's age and put the concept to the test." He appreciated the writers for trying to change the status quo calling it "both necessary and appreciated". He ultimately gave the season a 7.9/10. Alan Sepinwall of The Star-Ledger, while reviewing "Company Picnic", called the season "my favorite season of The Office to date" commenting, "I don't know that it's ever been this consistently satisfying, because the characters have become so richly-drawn, and because the writers [...] have really learned to trust their actors to convey so much emotion in really quiet moments".

Awards
The fifth season has received a significant number of nominations, including 10 for Emmy Awards, 3 for Teen Choice Award, and 2 for TCA Awards. The ten nominations for the 2009 Emmy Awards were announced on July 16, and include the categories: "Comedy Series" for the entire season; "Comedy Series Lead Actor" for Steve Carell for the episode "Broke"; "Comedy Series Supporting Actor" for Rainn Wilson in "Heavy Competition"; "Comedy Series Directing" for Jeffrey Blitz for the episode "Stress Relief"; "Comedy Series Editing" for Stuart Brass for "Two Weeks", Claire Scanlon for "Dream Team", and David Rogers and Dean Holland for "Stress Relief"; "Comedy Series Sound Mixing" for "Michael Scott Paper Company"; "Comedy Series Casting" for Allison Jones; "Interactive Media - Fiction" for 'The Office Media Experience, NBC.com. It won an Emmy for Outstanding Directing in a Comedy Series for Jeffrey Blitz for the episode Stress Relief. 

The three Teen Choice Awards nominations were for the show, the actor and the actress categories. The Television Critics Awards nominations were for the "Outstanding Achievement in Comedy" and for "Individual Achievement in Comedy" categories. The show also received nominations from TCA for best TV of the decade for Comedy Series and two for Comedy Actor.

Episodes

In the following table, "U.S. viewers (million)" refers to the number of Americans who viewed the episode on the night of broadcast. Episodes are listed by the order in which they aired, and may not necessarily correspond to their production codes.

 denotes an hour-long episode (with advertisements; actual runtime around 42 minutes).

Media release
The fifth season was released as boxsets on DVD and on Blu-ray on September 9, 2009. The 5 DVD box set includes, aside from the episodes, multiple deleted scenes, episode commentaries by various members of the production team, a "Gag Reel", a presentation of the show made by the Academy of Television Arts & Sciences, show ads that ran during the Super Bowl and during the 2008 Beijing Olympics, as well as several webisodes. The Blu-ray version has 4 discs and includes, in addition to the DVD content, BD-LIVE, a program which allows access to BD-Live Center for accessing online content such as trailers and downloading exclusive content. Another software included is "One-Liner Soundboard" which allows users to create audio mixes from stringing one-liners and quotes from the show, and to share these online via BD-LIVE. On the same date, The Office: Seasons 1–5 Collection was also made available.

References

External links
 
 

 
2008 American television seasons
2009 American television seasons